Cathy Whims (born 1956) is an American chef and restaurateur based in Portland, Oregon. She is a six-time James Beard Foundation Award finalist, and has owned several restaurants in Portland, including Genoa, Nostrana, and the pizzeria Oven and Shaker.

Early life and influences
The daughter of Harold Carter Whims, Jr., and Ann Virginia Thomas (née Thomas) Whims, Cathy Whims was born in 1956 and raised in Chapel Hill, North Carolina. Her mother was "from the Julia Child-era school" of cooking. Whims has also been influenced by Italian-born cooking writer Marcella Hazan and French chef and restaurateur Madeleine Kamman. Whims had studied with Hazan in Venice in 1998, and later had worked at restaurants in Italy's Langhe region. Following Hazan's death in 2013, Whims commemorated the chef by creating a special tribute menu at Nostrana. Nostrana's menu has featured other recipes inspired by Hazan, as well as American chef, baker, and writer Nancy Silverton.

Career

Early in her career, Whims was the bread and pastry chef in a local natural food restaurant and catered private dinners in Chapel Hill, and later worked at kitchens in the San Francisco Bay Area. She relocated to Portland in 1979 and immediately began working at Produce Row Cafe.

Whims later served as a prep cook at the Italian restaurant Genoa. She rose to executive chef and became a co-owner during her eighteen-year tenure at Genoa, which was credited "for bringing fine-dining to Portland", before it closed in 2014. 

Whims opened several restaurants in Portland, including Nostrana (2005–present), Hamlet (2015–2017), and the pizzeria/bar Oven and Shaker (2011–present). Hamlet was named one of Portland's best restaurants by Portland Monthly in 2015.

In 2017, Whims served as Oregon's ambassador of the James Beard Foundation's Smart Catch program, which promotes sustainable seafood practices. She opened the 40-seat wine European bar Enoteca Nostrana, adjacent to Nostrana, in 2018.

Recognition

After opening Nostrana, Whims received six consecutive James Beard Foundation Award nominations for Best Chef: Northwest, each year from 2008 to 2013. She was also nominated for a 2016 James Beard Foundation Journalism Award in the "Home Cooking" category for a story she co-authored with Langdon Cook called "Into the Woods", published in EatingWell magazine.

Whims won the first "Wild About Game Cook-Off", held in Welches, a town about 40 miles southeast of Portland, with her "Qualgie Con Fiche, a brace of semiboneless quail pan-roasted with a sauce of homemade fig jam, accompanied by polenta and braised greens, and a glass of Three Rivers 1999 Syrah".

Whims has been described by Portland Monthly Benjamin Tepler as "the unofficial doyenne of Italian cooking" for the Pacific Northwest. Katie Chang of Food Republic wrote, "Whims also helped train and usher in a new generation of talented chefs and restaurateurs... whom many credit with cementing Portland's status as a world-class dining destination." Her recipes have been shared in cookbooks and by a variety of other publications such as Epicurious, The Seattle Times, and The Wall Street Journal.

Personal life
Whims is married and lives in Portland, Oregon. Her partner, David West, co-owns Nostrana and Enoteca Nostrana. She has described herself as a "born-again Italian". Whims has a sister who also works in the restaurant industry.

See also
 List of American restaurateurs
 List of people from Portland, Oregon

References

External links
 "The Simple Secret to Making Button Mushrooms Intensely Delicious" by Cathy Whims (March 12, 2020), The Wall Street Journal

1956 births
Living people
21st-century American businesspeople
21st-century American women
American women chefs
American women restaurateurs
American restaurateurs
Businesspeople from North Carolina
Businesspeople from Portland, Oregon
Chefs from North Carolina
Chefs from Oregon
People from Chapel Hill, North Carolina
Restaurant founders